, son of regent Tadanori with Fujiwara Aritoki’s daughter and adopted son of Moronori, was a kugyō or Japanese court noble of the Kamakura period (1185–1333). He held a regent position (kampaku) from 1323 to 1324. Nijo Haruko, a daughter of Nijō Kanemoto was his wife with whom he adopted Michinori, son of his adopted father Moronori.

References
 

1290 births
1327 deaths
Fujiwara clan
Kujō family